Mariah Stewart is an author of romantic fiction whose titles have appeared on the New York Times and
USA Today bestsellers lists.  Stewart's books have won, or been nominated for, various major awards, including three-time recipient of the New Jersey Romance Writers' (NJRW) Golden Leaf Awards for The President's Daughter (Best Single Title Romance 2002), Voices Carry (Best Single Title Romance 2001), and for her very first novel, Moments in Time (Best Contemporary Novel 1998).  NJRW also awarded Stewart a Lifetime Achievement Award and inducted her into their Hall of Fame.

Other awards include the Reviewers International Organization Award of Excellence for Priceless (Favorite Contemporary Romance 1999), the Reviewers Choice Awards from Romantic Times for Moon Dance (Best Contemporary Romance 1999), and the Colorado Romance Writers' Award of Excellence for A Different Light (Best Single Title 1995).

Stewart is a New Jersey native.  She and her husband now reside in Chester County, Philadelphia "in a century old Victorian country home" with their daughters and Golden Retrievers.

Bibliography
From Stewart's official website:

Series
In reading order:

Dead series
 Dead Wrong (June 1, 2004) 
 Dead Certain (June 29, 2004) 
 Dead Even (3 Aug 2004) 
 Dead End (9 Aug 2005)

Truth series
 Cold Truth (30 Aug 2005) 
 Hard Truth (27 Sept 2005) 
 Dark Truth (25 Oct 2005) 
 Final Truth (May 30, 2006)

Last series
 Last Look (May 29, 2007) 
 Last Words (June 26, 2007) 
 Last Breath (July 31, 2007)

Continued FBI series
 Forgotten (September 2008)

Mercy series
 Mercy Street (March 2009) 
 Cry Mercy (May 2009) 
 Acts of Mercy (August 2009)

Anthologies
 Wait Until Dark (2001), with Linda Anderson, Andrea Kane, and Karen Robards
 Under the Boardwalk (1999), with Geralyn Dawson, Linda Howard, Jillian Hunter, and Miranda Jarrett
 Upon a Midnight Clear (1997) with Margaret Allison, Jude Deveraux, Stef Ann Holm, and Linda Howard

Other books
 Until Dark (2003)
 The President's Daughter (2002)
 Voices Carry (2001)
 Brown-Eyed Girl (2000)
 Priceless (1999)
 Moon Dance (1999)
 Wonderful You (1998)
 Devlin's Light (1997)
 Carolina Mist (1996)
 A Different Light (1995)
 Moments in Time (1995)

References

External links
 "A Conversation With Mariah Stewart" by Claire E. White of Writer's Write

20th-century American novelists
21st-century American novelists
American romantic fiction writers
Living people
American women novelists
Year of birth missing (living people)
Women romantic fiction writers
20th-century American women writers
21st-century American women writers